Live in Dublin (2007) is a live album by Canadian singer/songwriter Jeff Martin. The album is a complete recording of a live performance which included many songs written by The Tea Party, numerous covers (complete, and partial within other songs), as well as Martin's solo compositions.

Track listing 
"The Bazaar" (The Tea Party cover)
"Requiem" (The Tea Party)
"Hallelujah" (Leonard Cohen cover)
"I Love you" (Daniel Lanois cover)
"The Messenger" (Daniel Lanois)
"Oceans" (The Tea Party)
"Winter Solstice" (The Tea Party)
"Lament"
"Black Snake Blues"
"In This Time" (The Tea Party)
"The Kingdom"
"Sister Awake" (The Tea Party)

Personnel
Jeff Martin - Vocals, guitar, production, mixing at Science Friction Studios
Wayne P. Sheehy - Drums and percussion
Roy Harper - Assistant mixing
Pat O'Donnell - Mastering at Quillroad Studios
Ian O Donaghue - Sound Engineering at The Sugar Club, 17 February 2007
Publishing - JMartin Music (SOCAN) 
Marco Holtappel - Artwork

Notes 
The album can only be purchased at Martin's live shows or from his website.

External links 
 Official website

Jeff Martin (Canadian musician) albums
2007 live albums